Patrick Schmollinger (born 2 September 1973 in Waiblingen, Baden-Württemberg) is a retired male breaststroke swimmer from Austria, who was born in Germany. He represented Austria at the 2000 Summer Olympics in Sydney, Australia, finishing in 22nd place in the men's 100m breaststroke event.

References
sports-reference

1973 births
Living people
People from Waiblingen
Sportspeople from Stuttgart (region)
Austrian male breaststroke swimmers
Olympic swimmers of Austria
Swimmers at the 2000 Summer Olympics